Ursuline Academy is a four-year college-preparatory independent girls’ Catholic high school in Blue Ash, Ohio, United States. , 658 students from all over Greater Cincinnati are enrolled in the school, representing 50 different ZIP codes.

History
Ursuline Academy was founded in 1896 by the Ursuline sisters of Brown County, who also founded St. Ursula Academy and Chatfield College.

Academics
Ursuline offers a curriculum of over 100 courses specifically designed to prepare the student for the demands of college level programs. A modular schedule (see below) is enhanced by the open-area structure which provides flexible learning areas. Twenty-six different co-curricular activities are available to students including 13 different sports at various levels.

The tuition for 2018-2019 is $13,299, $275 additional for technology; $175 additional for activity fee. Tuition does not include fees for Kairos and Graduation. Each class level has certain fees such as retreat fees, special class equipment fees, etc.

Modular schedule
During the 1970s, Ursuline switched to a modular schedule. This consists of 6 days (lettered A-F) each with 18 modules. Each mod is 20 min, with a 3 min passing time between each one added in 2004. Classes range from 2-4 modules long. Students say that the schedule works very well in helping them with time management and responsibility.

Each also has a certain number of free mods each day to eat, study, do homework, work in the library, or socialize. As the choice of classes becomes more open to each student, free mods become more abundant. A typical student would have between 21 and 40 free mods a cycle, depending on the number of classes taken.

Different schedule days are set up so that mods can be shortened, (to incorporate time for a pep rally, department meeting, etc.) but are never skipped.

Clubs and activities

The Ursuline Writing Center is a service for students seeking dialogue and assistance regarding their writing. The Writing Center is staffed by carefully selected and trained upperclasswomen and the English Department faculty. Through one-on-one sessions of reading, response, conversation and writing—peer tutors and faculty members assist students to become their own best composers and editors.  Within this format, the center's core mission is to support writing at all grade levels and in all subjects and offered languages.  The Writing Center is open every school day during Mods 3-16.

Athletics
Ursuline Academy is a member of the GGCL

Ohio High School Athletic Association State Championships

Girls Tennis - 1994
Girls Tennis - Doubles 2012
Girls Tennis - Singles 2011
Girls Volleyball - 1975, 1993, 2002, 2009, 2012, 2017, 2018, 2022
Girls Swimming and Diving – 1991, 1998, 2000, 2001, 2002, 2013, 2014
Girls Golf – 1999

Other athletic accomplishments
Golf State Runner-up 1992, 1998, 2003
Swimming and Diving State Runner-up 1992, 1994, 1995, 1996, 1999, 2003, 2004, 2005, 2006, 2007, 2008, 2011, 2012
Volleyball State Runner-up 1995, 2001, 2003, 2008
Volleyball National Runner Up 2009
Tennis State Runner-up 2000, 2011
Field Hockey Final Four State - 1998, 2001, 2012, 2018
Cross Country State Qualifier - 2003, 2013, 2017 *State Runner Up

Notable alumnae
 Marguerite Clark (1899) - Silent film actress
 Theresa Rebeck (1976) - Playwright, novelist and screenwriter
 Amy Yasbeck (1980) - Actress and widow of actor John Ritter
 Linda Vester (1983) - Former news anchor at NBC and Fox News
 Sharon Wheatley (1985) - Broadway actress and writer
 Erin Phenix (1999) - 2000 Olympics - Swimming gold medalist Women's 4x100 Freestyle Relay

References

External links
Official Website

Private schools in Cincinnati
Catholic secondary schools in Ohio
Girls' schools in Ohio
Educational institutions established in 1896
Ursuline schools
Blue Ash, Ohio
Roman Catholic Archdiocese of Cincinnati
1896 establishments in Ohio